The 1924 Creighton Bluejays football team was an American football team that represented Creighton University as a member of the North Central Conference (NCC) during the 1924 college football season. In its second season under head coach Chet A. Wynne, the team compiled a 6–1–2 record (3–1 against NCC opponents) and outscored opponents by a total of 182 to 57. The team played its home games in Omaha, Nebraska.

Schedule

References

Creighton
Creighton Bluejays football seasons
Creighton Bluejays football